was one of 10 s built for the Imperial Japanese Navy during World War I.

Design and description
The Kaba-class destroyers were improved versions of the preceding . The Kabas were powered by three vertical triple-expansion steam engines, each driving one shaft using steam produced by four Kampon water-tube boilers. Two boilers burned a mixture of coal and fuel oil while the other pair only used oil. Their crew consisted of 92 officers and ratings.

The main armament of the Kaba-class ships consisted of a single quick-firing (QF)  gun located on the bow. They were also armed with four QF  guns on single mounts. Two guns were positioned abreast the middle funnel, one gun was on the aft superstructure and the fourth gun was on the stern. The destroyers' torpedo armament consisted of two twin rotating mounts for  torpedoes located between the superstructure and the stern gun.

Construction and career 
Kusunoki was launched on 5 March 1915 at Kawasaki's shipyard in Kobe and completed on 31 March. During World War I the ship patrolled the area around Singapore and later served as a convoy escort in the Mediterranean Sea. She was stricken from the navy list in November 1931, decommissioned on 1 April 1932 and subsequently broken up.

References

Bibliography

 

Kaba-class destroyers
World War I destroyers of Japan
Ships built by Kawasaki Heavy Industries
Japan–Malta relations
1915 ships